Tibbot MacWalter (Theobald Fitzwalter) Kittagh Bourke, 21st Mac William Íochtar (Irish: Tiobóid mac Walter Ciotach Búrca) (c.1570 – in or after 1602) was the first and last person to hold that title following its restoration. He was inaugurated at Kilmaine by Hugh Roe O'Donnell in December 1595 to secure Mayo for the rebel Irish Alliance during the Nine Years' War. His rule was opposed by many Bourke nobles, most notably by his arch-rival, the loyalist chief Tibbot na Long Bourke. The two men fought for supremacy over the MacWilliam Lordship (modern-day County Mayo) throughout the war and control of the area changed hands on numerous occasions. Following Kittagh's flight to Spain (and creation as "Marquess of Mayo") in 1602, the MacWilliam chieftainship was abolished yet again, and Tibbot na Long would thereafter be made Viscount Mayo.

Family 
Born in Ardnaree, near modern-day Ballina, County Mayo, Tiobóid was the eldest child of Walter Kittagh Bourke (died 1591), the High Sheriff of Sligo, and eldest but illegitimate son of Seaán mac Oliver Bourke (Sir John Bourke), 17th Mac William Íochtar and first Baron Ardenerie (d.1580). His mother was Mary O'Donnell, a seemingly distant relation to the Lord of Tyrconnell. Kittagh had four brothers – Thomas (d. 1597), Richard (d. 1589), Meyler and Walter, as well as four sisters – Mary, Cecilia, Sabina and the youngest sister whose name is unknown. The second youngest sister, Sabina, would marry the chief of Mac Sweeney Banagh.

While it is known that Kittagh was married, the identity of his wife and family is largely unknown. He had at least two children, Walter and Meyler. It is also suspected that John Burke, who was made commander of the Connacht forces during the Irish Confederate Wars in 1642, was also a son of Kittagh's, having been born in County Mayo yet spending "30 years in the service of Spain". John would have been about 10 at the time of Kittagh's journey to Spain.

Early life, arrest and exile 

The first mentions of Kittagh in historical accounts appear after his father's participation in the general MacWilliam rebellion of the 1580s against the Composition of Connacht. The English, under Perrot, had recognised Risdeárd Bourke as the rightful lord of the MacWilliam territories. Under English law this made his eldest son the automatic successor and all other nobles in the area, including Walter Kittagh, not only risked losing their lands and inheritance, but their right to the chieftainship as well. Walter Kittagh made peace with the English in late 1590 having secured his own lands but died shortly thereafter, leaving Tibbot in charge of his estate.

Despite having no part in the rebellion, the young Kittagh was soon prosecuted by his influential uncles Edmund and Richard. Consequently, on 20 February 1593, the Lord Deputy issued a general pardon for all persons in County Mayo, except Kittagh and 3 others. Governor Bingham procured a pardon for Kittagh, which to take effect would have to be brought before sessions later that year and pleaded. Upon hearing that sessions were to be held in Mayo, in which he was certain to be targeted by his uncles, he left for the Pale but was arrested at Athlone. While imprisoned there, Bingham applied to the Lord Deputy for a new pardon for Kittagh and allowed his wife to visit him.

It is alleged that Kittagh's wife conveyed a file to him which allowed him and several other prisoners to escape on 28 September. He and other Connacht outlaws fled to Tyrconnell to seek the protection of King Hugh Roe O'Donnell, who would go on to become Kittagh's close friend and ally. For his escape from Athlone, Kittagh was attainted. His castles at Cloonagashel, Castlebar and Belleek were seized and small English garrisons were placed in them.

Nine Years' War

Rebellion in Connacht and return 

In the early stages of the Nine Years' War from 1593 to 1595 the nobles of Connacht were largely sympathetic to the cause of the Ulster lords O'Donnell and O'Neill, and detested the presence of the Binghams (Richard and his brothers George and John) in their province. Most had risen up in rebellion against the Presidency by 1595 and the government in Dublin were forced to step in. While O'Donnell and the Connachtmen had strategically battled the English and had taken control of castles across the province, the government initially floundered in the face of the rebels.

Many of the soldiers brought in from England fell ill due to the damp conditions. The veteran soldiers who were already there were not given enough supplies and ammunition to retake lost territory, or even engage the rebels at all in most cases, and the new arrivals were so unskilled in the use of their weapons that their captains were forced to give them to the Irish shots in their pay. Kittagh had returned by August 1595 and was besieging Belleek castle, one of his former possessions. Captain Fowle was sent to relieve it and set out on 3 October but was killed en route. When the remainder of his party arrived they found that the castle had already been surrendered.

Sir Geoffrey Fenton temporarily relieved Bingham of his command and asked the Connacht rebels to meet him in Galway to agree a peace. On O'Donnell's recommendation, they refused to meet Fenton at Galway and instead insisted that the meeting be held at Moyne. They had drawn up a book of complaints and demanded only the removal of the Binghams and their officers. However, in separate negotiations, O'Donnell told the government that there would be no peace until Ballymote and all of Sligo were handed over to his kingdom.

Inauguration 

There was a general desire among the clans of Mayo to restore the MacWilliam chieftainship that had been abolished under Perrot and Bingham some years prior. O'Donnell had spent months in 1595 meeting and writing to nobles across Mayo to convince them to take part in a traditional inauguration ceremony. On 24 December they convened at Kilmaine, the "MacJordan, MacCostello, MacMaurice, O'Malley, MacDonnell and all the nobles of the country assembled there". Nine Bourkes competed for the title, including Kittagh, Tibbot na Long Bourke, Richard "the Devils Hook" Bourke and Kittagh's uncle Oliver Bourke. Unbeknownst to them, the result of the assembly was already a foregone conclusion.

O'Donnell strode in and "posing as a conqueror", positioned himself at the centre of proceedings. He had brought 1,800 soldiers with him as well as his subordinate chiefs MacSweeney and O'Doherty, who also brought their own men and gallowglass. O'Doherty ordered four rings of troops to be formed around the rath. O'Donnell's men formed the first ring, O'Doherty's the second, the MacSweeny's the third and the men of Connacht the fourth, outside of them all. O'Donnell and his chiefs assembled in the rath and "no one of the nobles or gentlemen was allowed to go into his presence in the rath but whomsoever he commanded to be called to him at the time". Despite the show of force, things initially looked promising. O'Donnell called in each of the nobles one by one to hear them make a case for their favoured candidate, and then called in the lesser clans to ask which chiefs they were in support of.

Age and experience were important considerations for most nobles and consequently William Bourke of Shrule, the eldest candidate, was also the most widely supported. Kittagh was the youngest and least popular candidate. He was backed by no other Bourke families and received only the support of the chiefs MacJordan and MacCostello, who stated that he was "strong and vigorous by day and by night at home and abroad, whether he had few or had many with him". Upon the conclusion of a highly unorthodox assembly, Kittagh was called up publicly by O'Donnell, amidst the heavy troop presence, and conferred the MacWilliam chieftainship by an elder of the Bourke clan. Three of the other contenders as well as hostages from the remainders were taken back to Tyrconnell.

O'Donnell was a military leader, not a statesman, and the decision to impose Kittagh on the nobles of Mayo was a diplomatic blunder. It left the Connachtmen outraged and turned once supportive and neutral nobles against him. Given that they had risen up against the English to secure greater independence, O'Donnell's behavior made them question whether they had traded one outside authoritarian for another. Had he just unilaterally restored the MacWilliam chieftainship with Kittagh at the helm, he may not have received such pushback from the other nobles, but assembling them at their traditional inauguration site and asking their advice, only to ignore it, was seen as an embarrassment and an insult.

Campaign into Galway 
Shortly after his inauguration, Kittagh marched with O'Donnell and several allied chieftains to the town of Athenry, which they burnt to the ground, taking every soldier stationed in the town and its nearby castles prisoner. From there they sent a messenger to Galway city to ask for provisions to support their war effort. The messenger, having been refused entry, was told that the city's ancient custom had been to not open the gates at night for any reason. The Mayor of Galway, Oliver Oge French, also told the messenger that he did not trust O'Donnell after the devastation he had wrought since the war's beginning.  The following day French received a personally written letter from O'Donnell; on the one hand offering money in exchange for basic provisions, which excluded powder and munitions, seemingly to allay French's fears, but on the other hand, threatened to "annoy [Galway city] as best he could" were they to refuse his offer. French responded that he would afford the Ulster lord and his allies no relief unless he halted his campaign of devastation against the towns and villages of Connacht.

In response, on the night of 17 January 1596 Kittagh and O'Donnell launched a surprise raid on the city and burned many houses on the outskirts of the town, killing 6 people before they were dispersed by cannon fire. Another attempt to set fire to these same vulnerable houses was made the following afternoon, but O’Donnell's agents were discovered and apprehended having burned just one house. The rebels returned to Mayo and, according to French, burnt every village on their way back, warning the inhabitants of Galway who had not yet risen up in rebellion that they would "shortly be worse used by the Spaniards, than the inhabitants of Athenry had been used by them". These early raids into Galway alienated much of the local lords and merchants from the rebel cause.

Opposition by rivals and ouster 

In June 1597, Kittagh and Rory O'Donnell, Hugh's brother, were stationed in Tirawley, with a force 700 strong, 300 Connachtmen and 400 soldiers from Tyrconnell. They were in complete control of Mayo; and all of Connacht except for Galway and Clare had either joined or been captured by the Irish alliance. However, the newly-appointed Governor Conyers Clifford led forces deep into Connacht in an attempt to reassert English control over the area. Clifford ordered Tibbot na Long and O’Conor Sligo, whose forces numbered some 1,000, to rout out the rebels. Clifford marched to Collooney to cut off their retreat. Kittagh and Rory attempted to escape to Ulster in July through the Ox Mountains but were intercepted and decisively beaten by Clifford's forces while attempting to cross the Owenmore River, with the loss 200 men and 1,200 cattle.

Building on his success, Clifford led his forces north and laid siege to Ballyshannon. However, he was forced to break the siege and retreat after five days upon receiving news that O'Neill had beaten back an invasion by Lord Burgh in Ulster, and was now free to join his forces with those of O'Donnell, Maguire and O'Rourke, which could potentially cut off Clifford's own retreat.

By the end of September, Kittagh returned to Mayo along with his allies Ulick Burke and Feriagh McHugh. The devastation caused by the war had led to famine and it was becoming increasingly difficult for both the rebels and the English to keep troops in the province for long periods. While his Ulster allies had retreated from the province, Kittagh intended to remain throughout the winter "through the strength of the bogs and the woods" as he knew Clifford did not have adequate manpower or supplies to push him out of Mayo. This second attempt at holding Mayo was also a failure for Kittagh and his allies. Safe in the knowledge that Clifford couldn't venture far into the county, they were ill-prepared for a surprise attack by Tibbot na Long, in which they lost 40 of their men (including Kittagh's brother Thomas) along with the remainder of their supplies, forcing them to retreat once again to Ulster.

By the end of October 1597 Kittagh was once again in exile and all of his approximately 1,000 followers in Mayo who had risen up to join the rebellion had now applied to Clifford for protection from the rebels, chiefly O’Donnell, whom they feared might return. By mid-November sheriffs were re-instated in Mayo and Sligo for the first time in 3 years and Kittagh was left without local allies. Another incursion by Kittagh into the province in January 1598 was quickly repelled.

Second return 

A truce was signed between the Irish alliance and the Dublin government, in effect from January to June 1598, during which time O’Neill negotiated with the English. One of O’Neill's principal demands was that Kittagh be granted seigniory over the MacWilliam Lordship. This was firmly rejected as Elizabeth had not been beaten to the point where she would be willing to disband her government's administration in Mayo and restore an abolished chieftainship, particularly to someone who was much loathed by his kinsmen and currently living in exile in Tyrconnell.

Relative calm returned to Connacht for the duration of the truce, but following the Irish alliance's decisive victory over the English forces at Yellow Ford on 14 August, the spectre of Kittagh once again loomed over Mayo. The careful patchwork of allegiances that Clifford had established in Mayo was in disarray, with Clifford writing that the allegiances were dependent only upon the promise of a pardon, and would falter in the face of any resistance.

Clifford was evidently correct in this regard as, following O’Donnell and Kittagh's return in mid-September, he noted "On the first day of MacWilliam's coming with O'Donnell's whole force. Mayo and Sligo are entirely lost". The McDonagh’s betrayed the English and took possession of Ballymote Castle, and offered to sell it back to Clifford before handing it over to O’Donnell intact in exchange for £400 and 300 cows. Kittagh marched onto Mayo and re-established himself there.

He now had 2,000 foot and 200 horse, and his forces increased daily by the arrival of Scottish mercenaries. Following the defeat at Yellow Ford, the terrified Dublin government recalled all of its soldiers to protect the capital. Clifford was left powerless with just 120 English soldiers and all of Connacht and Ulster were once again in rebel hands. Vastly outnumbered, Tibbot na Long made use of his family's famed navy and took to the sea with his forces. Kittagh and Niall Garbh raided across Mayo with impunity, crushing all dissent, including the Clangibbon who were wiped out in their entirety following a raid on their castle near Aughagower.

Escalation of the war 
For many months, Clifford made little progress in re-establishing order in Connacht, primarily due to the incompetency of Lord Essex and the Dublin government. At long last 1,000 well-trained English soldiers had arrived and Clifford was able to recover County Clare and Galway city in March 1599. In July, he was given £1500 by the English government, which forbade its administrators in Ireland from diverting from him, and was tasked with rebuilding the castle at Sligo, a town which was presently occupied by the pro-English O’Conors. Tibbot na Long sailed from Galway with military stores, provisions and building supplies and anchored in Sligo Bay awaiting Clifford, who was traveling north from Tulsk. Clifford, however, was not to arrive.

He had received faulty information that Curlew Pass was clear and was ambushed by O’Rourke attempting to cross it. The English forces, numbering some 2,000 were routed with great loss and Clifford was slain. The only thing that prevented complete catastrophe was an uphill cavalry charge led by Sir Griffin Markham, which stalled O'Rourke's men long enough to allow the routed soldiers to escape. This crushing defeat shattered English morale and the O’Conors surrendered to O’Donnell upon receiving Clifford's head.

Tibbot na Long, still anchored offshore, sent Morogh na Maor O’Flaherty to meet and drink wine with O’Donnell. It was here that O’Donnell proposed to O’Flaherty that Tibbot na Long, who possessed 3 three large galleys capable of carrying 300 men each, turn on the English ships accompanying him and seize them. Tibbot na Long declined and sailed back to Galway. He returned in September of that year to besiege Kittagh before being forced offshore again. In Galway, Richard Burke, Lord of Clanricarde, attacked his rival claimant Redmond Burke, Kittagh and O'Donnell's ally, killing 100 of his men.

While Tibbot na Long acted in the Queen's service, his family, remaining officially neutral, continued to support the rebels. Five O’Malley ships stationed themselves in the Shannon Estuary near Limerick, delivering supplies to the rebels and hampering the passage of the river by the English. The war, which initially began as a rebellion in Ulster which had spilled over into Connacht, was now operating on a much wider scale. Most of Leinster and Munster had now also fallen to the rebels and Kittagh's position and importance was much diminished. With so much else to focus on, O'Donnell couldn't afford to lose Mayo, and attempted to broker an end to hostilities there.

Plot to assassinate O'Donnell 

O’Donnell arranged a peace treaty between the warring factions of the Mac William Íochtar clan in December 1599, which was primarily a truce between the two Tibbots. In contrast to the previous year, where it was demanded that all of county Mayo be handed over to Kittagh; the rebel command agreed to restrict Kittagh's authority to his own barony of Tirawley in exchange for peace in Mayo. The warring Bourkes were free to fight on opposite sides of the war outside of Mayo, but agreed on an armistice within the county.

Throughout 1600 the English made stunning gains across Ireland, primarily due to Baron Mountjoy's scorched earth policy, which led to widespread famine across the country rendering it difficult for the Irish Alliance to hold onto the land they had taken. The English had a deliberate policy of bringing Irish lords onto their side, thus dividing the alliance. There are numerous examples of this, but the so-called masterstroke of the war came when Niall Garbh betrayed the alliance and allowed 4,000 English soldiers led by Henry Docwra to land at Lough Foyle, gutting the once impenetrable core of the rebellion, Tyrone and Tyrconnell. It was against this backdrop that Kittagh opened up negotiations with the English, hoping to betray O'Donnell in exchange for security of his own lands.

On the one hand O'Donnell had made Kittagh "the MacWilliam" and had supported him against his rivals throughout the war, but on the other hand had laid waste to Mayo. O'Donnell carried all the spoils of war back to Tyrconnell, failing to invest in his allies in Connacht. He therefore had effectively left Kittagh in charge of a desolate, largely hostile land incapable of sustaining enough troops to defend itself. Much of the fighting done by the lords of Connacht was done outside of their own war-shattered province.

Conscious of the changing tide of the war, Kittagh traveled to Galway city in June 1600 to meet with the notorious assassin James Blake (alias Captain Blackcaddell, the man who would later attempt to poison O'Donnell in Spain in 1602) to propose a plan of betrayal which was to be passed on by Blake to Captain Thomas Lee, whose eagerness to advance politically saw him engaged in widespread machinations throughout Ireland. Kittagh had intended to lure his "ally" to Donegal Abbey and kill O'Donnell. It was also hoped that O'Neill would attend, in which case he would be captured alive and sent to England, where he would surrender and call for an end to the war in Ireland. Lee, keen to reign in the influence of his Irish rival Thomas Butler, amended the plan on 7 September, requesting that Kittagh also murder Teigue O'Rourke and Donnchadh O'Conor at the meeting as they were "both Ormonde's", referring to their amenable relations with Butler.

O'Donnell would frequently return to Donegal to confer with his allies and meet those who had arrived in French and Spanish ships bringing supplies and intel. Kittagh, knowing he would be welcomed into Tyrconnell, planned to travel to the kingdom with 400 men. He would then kill and/or capture the rebel commanders and bring them or their bodies to Killybegs castle on Donegal's west coast, which he planned to purchase from Chief MacSweeny, his brother-in-law, for approximately £1,000. Kittagh and his men would then hold the castle until an English ship arrived to collect them.

After much back and forth between Kittagh and Lee, a final list of demands was compiled, which stated:
Kittagh be granted the title Earl of Mayo
To be her Majesty's lieutenant of the county
To have 150 horse and 50 foot
To receive £1,000 at once
Brian Óg O'Rourke to be made lord of his country and her Majesty's lieutenant for it, with 100 horse
Captain T. Lee to be governor of Connaught.

Lee's influence on these amended demands is clear, and most of them were accepted by the Queen on 24 December 1600, however she would not make Lee the governor of Connaught and Kittagh would receive his payment after he carried out the deed. Without the money for MacSweeny's castle paid to him in advance, it was impossible for Kittagh to carry out these assassinations. Following Lee's execution for treason in February 1601 the plan was abandoned permanently.

Final months and departure to Spain 
For unknown reasons, the peace that had existed in Mayo since December 1599 began to unravel in early 1601. Tibbot na Long moved his troops into Tirawley in a surprise attack on Kittagh on 2 March. Kittagh lost many men and arms and was forced to flee to Ulster yet again. In an unexpected return to ancient tradition for the loyalist lord, Tibbot na Long assembled a council of the nobles of Mac William Iochtar the following day in which they elected Richard "the Devils Hook" Bourke, Tibbot na Long's brother-in-law, as the 22nd MacWilliam Íochtar. With O'Donnell preoccupied elsewhere, Kittagh spent the next several months in exile waiting for assistance. Finally, in October 1601 he was provided with "all the men O'Donnell could spare" and re-invaded Mayo. While marching back to his home of Tirawley, Kittagh encountered the forces of his rival claimant and a fierce battle ensued during which Richard was killed. Kittagh once again proclaimed himself the chief of Mayo.

With only 300 men to his name, Tibbot na Long embarked on his three ships and departed the county. With his rivals beaten and peace having returned to Mayo, Kittagh joined O'Donnell at the Battle of Kinsale in late 1601. Following the defeat of the allied forces at Kinsale, Kittagh traveled with O'Donnell to Spain, landing in Luarca on 13 January 1602. Their allies were defeated in 1603 while they were away and Kittagh never returned. He was conferred the title of Marquess of Mayo by the Spanish monarch, Philip III, and he and his family were given a suitable pension to live on.

No more is known of his life after this. His son, Walter (living c.1650), later succeeded as 2nd Marquess of Mayo.

Arms

Genealogy

 Sir Edmond Albanach de Burgh (d. 1375),  1st Mac William Íochtar (Lower Mac William), (Mayo)
 William de Burgh (d.1368)
 Thomas mac Edmond Albanach de Burca, 1375–1402, 2nd Mac William Íochtar
 Walter mac Thomas de Burca (d.1440), 3rd Mac William Íochtar
 Theobald Bourke (d.1503), 8th Mac William Íochtar
 Meiler Bourke (d.1520), 11th Mac William Íochtar
 Ricard Bourke (d.1509), 9th Mac William Íochtar
 Seaán an Tearmainn Bourke (alive 1527), 13th Mac William Íochtar
 Ricard mac Seaán an Tearmainn Bourke (d.1571), 16th Mac William Íochtar
 Edmund na Féasóige de Burca, (d.1458), 4th Mac William Íochtar
 Ricard Ó Cuairsge Bourke (d.1473), 7th Mac William Íochtar
 Edmond de Burca (d.1527), 10th Mac William Íochtar
 Walter de Burca
 Seaán de Burca
 Oliver de Burca
 Seaán mac Oliver Bourke (d.1580), 17th Mac William Íochtar
 Richard Bourke (d.1586), 19th Mac William Íochtar
 Walter Ciotach de Burca of Belleek (d.1591)
 Tibbot (Theobald) MacWalter Kittagh Bourke, 21st Mac William Íochtar, 1st Marquess of Mayo
 Walter (Balthasar) Bourke, 2nd Marquess of Mayo
 Thomas Ruadh de Burca
 Uilleag de Burca
 Edmond de Burca (d.1527), 12th Mac William Íochtar
 David de Burca (alive 1537), 15th Mac William Íochtar
 Richard the Iron Bourke (d.1583), 18th Mac William Íochtar
 Tibbot (Theobald) ne Long Bourke (1567-1629), 23rd Mac William Íochtar, 1st Viscount Mayo (1627)
 Viscounts Mayo
 William "the Blind Abbot" Bourke (d.1593), 20th Mac William Íochtar
 Theobald mac Uilleag Bourke (d.1537), 14th Mac William Íochtar
 Risdeárd de Burca
 Ricard Deamhan an Chorráin de Burca
 Risdeárd Mac Deamhan an Chorráin (Richard) "the Devils Hook" Bourke (d.1601), 22nd Mac William Íochtar
 Seaán de Burca (d.1456)
 Tomás Óg de Burca, (d.1460), 5th Mac William Íochtar
 Risdeárd de Burca (d.1473), 6th Mac William Íochtar

See also 
 Clanricarde
 Burke Civil War 1333–38
 Ireland 1536–1691
 Surrender and regrant

References

Bibliography 
 A genealogical and heraldic history of the landed gentry of Great Britain, Bernard Burke. 1879.
 Random Notes on the History of County Mayo G. V. Martyn. Journal of the Galway Archaeological and Historical Society Vol. 14, No. 3/4 (1929), pp. 133–137
 The History of Mayo, Hubert T. Knox. 1908.
 Murdering Heart...Murdering Hand": Captain Thomas Lee of Ireland, Elizabethan Assassin,  James P. Myers, Jr. The Sixteenth Century Journal Vol. 22, No. 1 (Spring, 1991), pp. 47–60
 Queen Elizabeth and her times : a series of original letters, selected from the inedited private correspondence of the lord treasurer Burghley, the Earl of Leicester, the secretaries Walsingham and Smith, Sir Christopher Hatton, and most of the distinguished persons of the period, Thomas Wright. 1838.
 Lower Mac William and Viscounts of Mayo, 1332–1649, in A New History of Ireland IX, pp. 235–36, Oxford, 1984 (reprinted 2002).

Mayo
Irish lords
Burke
16th-century Irish people
17th-century Irish people
Tibbot MacWalter Kittagh
People of the Nine Years' War (Ireland)
People from Ballina, County Mayo
Marquesses of Spain